Sen Çal Kapımı (known as Love is in the Air in other territories) is a Turkish television series starring Hande Erçel and Kerem Bürsin. It premiered on Fox on July 8, 2020 and concluded on September 8, 2021.

Episodes

Season One  
Eda Yıldız is living with her aunt and works in the flower shop of her aunt. Her parents died in an accident. She wanted to study and have a good career but she couldn't complete her graduation from a landscape architecture faculty because of Serkan Bolat. He is the owner of renowned architect firm who has promised to give scholarships to the students but cancelled them later. It's Eda's dream to fly to Italy. She has a long-distance boyfriend Cenk. She meets Serkan Bolat at a graduation ceremony and gets handcuffed with him in anger. Serkan has a ex-girlfriend Selin who got engaged recently after their breakup. In order to get her back, Serkan offers Eda a contract according to which she has to pretend to be his fiancée for two months and in return he will pay for her travel, food, education and stay in Italy. She rejects the offer initially. Meanwhile, her boyfriend leaves her for another girl and in anger Eda kisses Serkan in front of everyone. Then she accepts the offer but makes some changes. She will pretend to be his fiancée for two months but he should give her a job in his firm. So she gets a job as Serkan's personal assistant. They start working together and due to business work he announces an engagement party with Eda. And eventually they fall in love.

Season Two  
Serkan Bolat and Eda Yıldız go through tough times during Serkan's cancer treatment. Serkan, who becomes obsessed with his disease and a completely different man after surviving, arouses a fear of emotional attachment, delaying his marriage to Eda multiple times and completely refusing the idea of becoming a father. Serkan returns to focus only on his work, which will gradually separate him from Eda. The latter goes to Italy to complete her studies, while Serkan continues with his life, but when they finally meet again after 5 long years, life has a surprise for both.Eda has a daughter named Kiraz. Serkan comes there to attend Piril's meeting and is stopped in the way by Kiraz he drops Kiraz home and meets Eda there he has lunch with Eda and they both discuss about their lives. Eda doesn't want Serkan to know that Kiraz is his daughter and lies that she is Melo and Burak daughter and asks Piril not to tell him but initially tells him about her and they get married Eda gets pregnant and gives birth to her son.

Reception
The series debuted in the summer of 2021 in Italy, in daytime on Canale 5, with good success. In September 2021, it was confirmed that the second season would air on Canale 5.

In Spain, the series initially aired on Telecinco. After initially producing views below expectations, it was moved to Divinity, where it aired in the afternoon, standing out and enjoying great success, becoming an unexpected "summery talisman" in the 2021 summer. In September 2021, during the broadcast of the series finale, Love is in the Air'''s episode became the most tweeted in history, beating the previous record of 7.8 million tweets set by Game of Thrones' The Long Night''.

Cast

Main characters
 Eda Yıldız (episodes 1–52), played by Hande Erçel. 
A dreamer and passionate about flowers, Eda lives with the pain of the premature loss of her parents. She has a bitter enemy: Serkan Bolat. In fact, he canceled her scholarship, preventing her from graduating as a landscape architect and studying in Italy. That's why she works in her aunt's flower shop, who raised her and who treated her like her own daughter. They both share a home with Eda's childhood friend, Melo.
 Serkan Bolat (episodes 1–52), played by Kerem Bürsin. 
Hypochondriac, obsessive, cold and workaholic, Serkan Bolat is a wealthy internationally renowned architect, owner of Art Life, intent on preventing the marriage of his ex-girlfriend, Selin. To do this he proposes to Eda to pretend to be his girlfriend for two months: once the contract has expired, he will pay her back her scholarship

Secondary characters
 Engin Sezgin (episodes 1-52), played by Anil Ilter. He is Serkan's best friend and Piril's husband. 
 Piril Baytekin (episodes 1–52), played by Başak Gümülcinelioğlu. One of Serkan’s friends. She later becomes close to Eda as well. She is happily married to Engin Sezgin and has a son. She is a fine architect and has a nature quite similar to that of Serkan.
 Melek Yucel / Melo (episodes 1–52) played by Elçin Afacan. She is one of Eda’s close friends as well as housemate and they both have spent their childhood together. She is a dreamer and generally funny. Her dream is to find true love.
 Ceren Bașar (episodes 1–37) played by Melisa Döngel. One of Eda’s friends. She grows up in a rich lawyer family and is forced to become a lawyer too, however, her dream is to become a shoe designer. She is a fashion icon. Ceren dates Selin’s ex-fiancé, eventually getting married to him and becoming pregnant.
 Figen Yildirim / Fifi (episodes 1-28), played by M. Sitare Akbas. She is one of Eda's friends.
 Selin Atakan (episodes 1–22, 29–38), played by Bige Önal. Serkan's former girlfriend and childhood friend, she is the PR of the company and his partner in the family business built by their fathers. She is Eda's main antagonist.
 Ferit Simsek (episodes 1-39), played by Cagri Citanak. Selin's former fiancé. He is originally the reason for Eda and Serkan's fake engagement as Serkan did not trust Ferit. After his breakup with Selin, he has a relationship with Ceren.
 Leyla Haktan (episodes 1-39) played by Ilkyaz Arslan. She is Serkan's assistant.
 Erdem Sangay (episodes 1-52), played by Sarp Bozkurt. He is Engin's assistant.
Deniz Saraçhan (episodes 29–37), played by Sarp Can Köroğlu. He's been friends with Eda since elementary school. He initially helps her in her romance with Serkan but is secretly in love with her.
 Alexander Zucco (episodes 24–27, 29–34), played by Hakan Karahan.
 Semiha Yıldırım (episodes 23–28), played by Ayşegül İşsever. She is Eda's grandmother on the paternal side. Extremely rich, she has always frowned upon Eda's parents' marriage and does not appreciate her bond with Serkan Bolat.
 Tahir (episodes 23–28), played by Buğrahan Çayır.
 Balça Koçak (episodes 22–28), played by İlayda Çevik. He will briefly be the PR of Serkan's company and Eda's antagonist.
 Prens Seymen (episodes 25–26), played by Mert Öcal.
 Efe Akman (episodes 13–21), played by Ali Ersan Duru. He is a highly rated architect abroad who will be a partner in Serkan's company for a short time.
 Kaan Karadağ (episodes 1–10), played by İsmail Ege Şaşmaz. He is an old college friend of Serkan but now he hates him deeply and is always competing with him. He is Ferit's best friend.
 Kiraz (episodes 40–52), played by Maya Başol. She is the daughter of Serkan and Eda.
 Burak Balcı (episodes 40-52), played by Sinan Helvacı. A close friend of Eda who is secretly platonically in love with her, gets along really well with Kiraz.
 Ayfer Yildiz (episode1-52), played by Evrim Dogan. She is the aunt of Eda.
 Aidan Bolat (episode 1-52), played by Neslihan Yeldan. She is the mother of Serkan.

International broadcasting

References

External links
 

2020 Turkish television series debuts
2021 Turkish television series endings
Turkish drama television series
Turkish television soap operas
Turkish romantic comedy television series
Fox (Turkish TV channel) original programming
Turkish-language television shows
Television series produced in Istanbul